The Gamsby River is a river in the Kitimat Ranges of the North Coast region of British Columbia, Canada.  It flows southwest to meet the Kitlope River, of which it is a tributary.

See also
List of rivers of British Columbia

References

Rivers of the Kitimat Ranges
Rivers of the North Coast of British Columbia